Rancho Los Alamitos takes its name from an 1834 Mexican partition of the 1784 Rancho Los Nietos, a Spanish concession, covering an area in present-day California's southwestern Los Angeles County and northwestern Orange County. Los Alamitos means the Little Cottonwoods or Poplars in Spanish, after the native Fremont Cottonwood trees there.

Rancho Los Alamitos originally included much of the area of present-day eastern Long Beach, all of Los Alamitos and Rossmoor, and most of Seal Beach, Cypress, Stanton and Garden Grove. It is also sometimes referred to as Bixby Ranch, after its last private owners. The early 19th century adobe ranch house still stands today, housing a museum which presents the history of the area.

History
The history of the  Rancho Los Alamitos is almost a microcosm for the history of expansion throughout Southern California, from the Native Americana cultures to contemporary times. The area was first the location of the major circa 500 C.E. - 1780s Tongva — Gabrieliño sacred ceremonial and trading village of Povuu'nga, now an archeological site. After Spanish occupation the ownership was to change and the boundaries would shrink many times. Situated in the floodplain between the mouths of the ever-shifting Los Angeles, San Gabriel and Santa Ana Rivers, the coastal plain terrain of the rancho is virtually flat rich soil, and was subject to frequent flooding. The rancho building itself is located near Puvunga springs alongside on one of the few small hills, Alamitos Mesa, in the area.

Rancho Los Alamitos was one of five ranchos that resulted from the partition of the original Rancho Los Nietos grant given to Manuel Nieto, a former sergeant in the Spanish army, in 1784 by governor Pedro Fages, coincidentally his former commander. Nieto's grant was not only one of the first three awarded by the Spanish in Alta California, it was also the largest. After Nieto died, his children requested his original grant be partitioned. In 1834, Mexican governor José Figueroa officially declared Rancho Los Alamitos as one of the five partitions.

In 1844 the rancho was purchased by Abel Stearns, a Massachusetts native who typified the many Yankees who settled in California and merged with the ruling Mexican Californios population. Stearns, who married Arcadia Bandini, the daughter of the early Spanish regional civic and business leader Juan Bandini, became one of the leading merchants and major ranchos owners in Mexican Alta California.

The rancho was on the periphery of the battles that settled the California Campaign of the Mexican–American War by 1846. During the California Gold Rush, the rancho supplied much of the beef that would be herded north to feed the growing number of Immigrants who were flocking to the gold fields of Northern California from 1848 on. After California became a U.S. state in 1850, Rancho Los Alamitos was the headquarters of the largest cattle ranch then in existence in the United States. Through shrewd business dealings, Stearns assumed control of Los Alamitos and many other surrounding ranchos.

After a disastrous drought in the 1860s, Stearns lost control of the ranch which was then sub-let to a number of farmers until the early 1880s when John William Bixby, a cousin of Jotham Bixby and Llewellyn Bixby who controlled the adjacent Rancho Los Cerritos, bought the rancho along with a group which included his cousins and Isaias Hellman, the founder of the Farmers and Merchants Bank of Los Angeles.

Trying to capitalize on the 1880s Southern California land boom, John Bixby developed the townsite of Alamitos Beach, which would eventually be assumed by Long Beach. Before Bixby could do much more he died suddenly in 1888, apparently due to an appendicitis attack, and Rancho Los Alamitos was separated between three major parties. The developed Alamitos Beach properties were shared equally, while John Bixby's heirs kept the central section of the remaining rancho, the Bixby cousins from Rancho Los Cerritos assumed control of the northern section, and Hellman took control of the southern lands around present day Seal Beach. Unfortunately, a financial crisis prevented the various parties from seriously pursuing John Bixby's dream of developing Alamitos Beach.

The Bixbys had once flirted with sugar beet production on properties they held in Northern California. In the 1890s, Jotham Bixby arranged to provide land on the rancho for sugar beet production and recruited the capital of William Clark, who was amongst the richest men in the United States, to build a sugar beet refinery plant on a portion of the Bixby Ranch property. Later oil discoveries from the Long Beach Oil Field continued to fund the rancho.

The historic ranch house, surrounding ranching facilities, and some open landscape of Rancho Los Alamitos can still be found adjacent to Cal State Long Beach. The Bixby family descendants donated the property to the City of Long Beach in 1967.

Historic sites of the Rancho
The early 19th century adobe ranch house still stands today, surrounded by its historic gardens designed by Frederick Law Olmsted Jr. and Florence Yoch & Lucile Council, all of which are on the National Register of Historic Places. The Rancho Los Alamitos house and grounds are a museum which presents the history of the rancho era, the country house era, and the region.

See also
 Los Cerritos Ranch House
 List of City of Long Beach Historic Landmarks
 List of Ranchos of California

References

External links
Official Rancho Los Alamitos: Historic Ranch and Gardens website
Rancho Los Alamitos: Historical and Architectural Narrative. (33pg. pdf)
 National Park Service Teaching with Historic Places (TwHP) lesson plan: “Californio to American: A Study in Cultural Change”
National Park Service Discover Our Shared Heritage Travel Itinerary: Early History of the California Coast
Rancho Los Alamitos: History Timeline of Ownership & Occupants

Alamitos, Los
Los Alamitos
Los Alamitos
Gardens in California
Houses in Los Angeles County, California
Historic house museums in California
Museums in Long Beach, California
Open-air museums in California
Houses on the National Register of Historic Places in California
Buildings and structures on the National Register of Historic Places in Los Angeles County, California
Ranches on the National Register of Historic Places in California
Garden Grove, California
Los Alamitos, California
Long Beach, California
Paramount, California
History of Long Beach, California
History of Orange County, California
Landscape design history of the United States
Landmarks in Long Beach, California
Los Alamitos